Thomas Stafford, 3rd Earl of Stafford (c. 1368–4 July 1392) was the second son—but the senior surviving heir—of Hugh Stafford, 2nd Earl of Stafford and Philippa de Beauchamp, daughter of Thomas de Beauchamp, 11th Earl of Warwick. His elder brother, his father's heir, Sir Ralph Stafford, was murdered by Richard II's half-brother, the earl of Huntingdon whilst they were campaigning in Scotland in July 1385. As a result, Thomas became heir to the earldom of Stafford, and in 1390 he was knighted. He gained livery of his estates in 1391 and paid homage to the king for them on 20 October that year. He spent his short career campaigning in France alongside the duke of Gloucester.

Thomas Stafford married Anne, daughter of Thomas, Duke of Gloucester around 1390. He died on 4 July 1392 in Westminster, and was interred in Stone, with his father; his widow, Anne, with whom he had had no children, married his youngest brother Edmund Stafford, 5th Earl of Stafford.

References

External links
 Inquisition Post Mortem

03
1392 deaths
Year of birth uncertain